The NASA Ames Stereo Pipeline (ASP) is an open-source software package for photogrammetry. It can create digital elevation models and ortho images from stereo planetary data acquired with NASA spacecraft, including for the Moon, Mars, and all other bodies with a solid surface, and also from commercial Earth-orbiting satellites, such as Digital Globe and any vendors who support the RPC camera model, e.g., Pléiades and Cartosat. For stereo correlation ASP uses block-matching and semi-global matching. ASP also provides tools for correcting the input camera poses using bundle adjustment, registration of obtained terrain models using iterative closest point, and a tool for refining a 3D terrain model with shape from shading. ASP integrates the ISIS software for processing planetary data. Binary releases are available for Linux and OSX.

See also
Comparison of photogrammetry software
Integrated Software for Imagers and Spectrometers

References

External links
Official website
Code repository
Documentation

Photogrammetry software
NASA
Free and open-source software